Lorabela  plicatula is a species of sea snail, a marine gastropod mollusk in the family Mangeliidae.

Description
The length of the shell varies between 6 mm and 12 mm.

Distribution
This species occurs in the Ross Sea and Weddell Sea, Antarctica

References

 Thiele, Johannes. "Die antarktischen schnecken und muscheln." Deutsche Südpolar-Expedition (1901–1903) 13 (1912): 183-286.

External links
  Kantor Y.I., Harasewych M.G. & Puillandre N. (2016). A critical review of Antarctic Conoidea (Neogastropoda). Molluscan Research. 36(3): 153-206
  Tucker, J.K. 2004 Catalog of recent and fossil turrids (Mollusca: Gastropoda). Zootaxa 682:1-1295.
 

plicatula
Gastropods described in 1912